The Socialist Youth is the youth organization of Javnaðarflokkurin, a social democratic party in the Faroe Islands.

References

External links 
 List of contacts on the homepage of the mother party Javnaðarflokkurin 

Youth wings of political parties in the Faroe Islands
Youth wings of social democratic parties
Socialism in the Faroe Islands
Youth organizations established in 1965
1965 establishments in the Faroe Islands